The Uls is a river in Perm Krai, Russia, a left tributary of the Vishera. It starts near the border with Sverdlovsk Oblast. Its mouth is near the village of Ust-Uls,  from Vishera's mouth.

Main tributaries (from source to mouth):
Left: Olkhovka, Pelya, Bolshaya Zolotanka;
Right: Surya, Bolshaya Lyampa, Kutim, Myka .

References 

Rivers of Perm Krai